Hayashida (written:  lit. "woods ricefield") is a Japanese surname. Notable people with the surname include:

Fumiko Hayashida (1911–2014), American activist
, Japanese women's basketball player
, Japanese manga artist
, Japanese politician
, Japanese politician

Japanese-language surnames